Remoães is a former civil parish in the municipality of Melgaço in the Viana do Castelo District, Portugal. In 2013, the parish merged into the new parish Prado e Remoães. It has a population of 124 inhabitants and a total area of 0.96 km2.

References

Freguesias of Melgaço, Portugal